Azad Kin (also Romanized as Āzād Kīn) is a village in Khoshkrud Rural District, in the Central District of Zarandieh County, Markazi Province, Iran. At the 2006 census, its population was 132, in 48 families.

References 

Populated places in Zarandieh County